Ice Mountain is a mountain ridge in Hampshire County, West Virginia, US.

Ice Mountain may also refer to:

 Ice Mountain (Colorado), US, a mountain
 Ice Mountain (water), a brand of bottled water

See also
 Iceberg
 Icepeak (disambiguation)